"Almost There" is a song written by Gloria Shayne and Jack Keller and performed by Andy Williams in his film I'd Rather Be Rich (1964).  The song reached #12 on the U.S. adult contemporary chart and #67 on the Billboard chart in 1964. It also reached #2 in the UK in October 1965 for three weeks.  The A-side, "On the Street Where You Live", was also a hit, reaching #3 on the adult contemporary chart and #28 on the Billboard Hot 100.

Cover versions
Brenda Lee covered the song for her album The Versatile Brenda Lee (1965).

References

1964 singles
Songs written by Gloria Shayne Baker
Songs written by Jack Keller (songwriter)
Andy Williams songs
Columbia Records singles
1964 songs